A hoverbike (or hovercycle) is a vehicle that can hover, resembling a flying motorbike, having at least two propulsive portions—one in front of and one behind the driver.

Aeronautic motors
Starting in 2014, Malloy Aeronautics has been developing a hoverbike that has experimented with quadcopter-like lift.  In 2015, the company announced collaboration with the United States Defense Department at the Paris Airshow.

In April 2016, British inventor Colin Furze announced he had created a hoverbike using two paramotors.

The Aero-X is a hoverbike designed to carry up to two people.

The Hoversurf Scorpion 3 is a hoverbike launched in 2017. It is famously used by the Dubai Police Force.

The A.L.I. Technologies XTurismo was on sale in Japan from 2021, and in the United States the following year. It requires a pilot's licence in most countries, but not in Japan. It is considered a proof of concept with 200 to be made, with a smaller version planned for 2025, at a much lower price.

A one-person, or unmanned cargo, flying vehicle with four jet motors at the corners using artificial intelligence to maintain stability that has been described as a "flying motorbike" and named "Speeder" was under development in 2022, an idea that emerged from work with the US Navy.  several full-size prototypes had been built.

In fiction
 This concept is commonly used in futuristic cyberpunk games such as Mass Effect 3 or Cyberpunk 2077.
In the Star Wars universe, characters use speeder bikes lifted by repulsorlift engines.
In Heroes of the Storm, Blizzard's crossover video game, heroes can use numerous types of hovercycles as mounts to increase their movement speed on the battlefield.
 In the television show Kamen Rider Revice, Kamen Rider Revi rode a hoverbike based on the A.L.I. Technologies XTurismo as his main mode of transport.

See also
 Hoverboard
 Hovercar

References

Bike
Motorcycle technology